The mass media in Bangladesh refers to the print, broadcast and online mass media available in Bangladesh. The Constitution guarantees press freedom and freedom of expression within "reasonable restriction", though some media outlets have been harassed. The Bangladeshi media's rank is dropped to 146 in 2018 from its position of 144 in 2016 out of total 180 countries on the Reporters Without Borders Press Freedom Index, with 1st being most free.

Overview
The media in Bangladesh is a mix of government-owned and private media. There are still criminal penalties for libel, defamation and sedition as well as reporting on national security issues. Reporters can be held for up to 120 days without trial under the 1974 Special Powers Act. Media restrictions have usually increased during periods of political turmoil. Reporters Without Borders has accused the army of targeting journalists and enforcing censorship.

News agencies
News agencies were present in Bangladesh prior to its independence from Pakistan in 1971. The state-owned Associated Press of Pakistan (AAP) had branches in Dhaka and Chittagong from 1949. After independence, the AAP was replaced by the Bangladesh state-owned agency Bangladesh Sangbad Sangstha. The second news agency to be established, and the first to be privately owned was Eastern News Agency (ENA). It was founded in Dhaka in the years immediately prior to the Bangladesh Liberation War by a consortium of six shareholders which included its founding editor Golam Rasul Mallick.  United News of Bangladesh, founded in 1988 was the country's first fully computerised privately owned agency. Other private news agencies include News Network of Bangladesh (NNB) and BD News 24 which also launched the country's first photo agency, Focus Bangla.

Newspapers

The print media is private and consists of hundreds of weekly publications, presenting a vast array of viewpoints, though some outspoken papers have faced pressure in the past. English language papers appeal to an educated urban readership.

Television and radio

Television is the biggest medium for news in Bangladesh. There were 15 television stations in 1999. In 2006, there were 15AM and 13FM radio stations available. The BBC World Service broadcasts in the country, and Indian and other foreign television broadcasts are picked up in the country. Currently there are more than 100 TV Channels in Bangladesh.

Bangladesh NGOs Network for Radio and Communication (BNNRC), NGO Network in Consultative Status with UN ECOSOC in considers community radio a special area for intervention. BNNRC has been promoting advocacy with the government in relation to community radio with other organizations since its emergence from 2000.

The objective of BNNRC's Community Radio intervention is to address crucial social issues at community level, such as poverty and social exclusion, empower marginalized rural groups and catalyze democratic processes and on going development efforts.

The prime role of community radio is giving voice to the voiceless people who do not have access to the mainstream media to express their ideas and views regarding community development. Promoting the right to communicate, speed up the process of informing the community, assist the free flow of information and therefore act as a catalyst of change are few major tasks are to be done by community radio. It will also uphold creative growth and democratic spirit in the community level.

As a result, the Ministry of Information of People's Republic of Bangladesh announced the Community Radio Installation, Broadcast and Operation Policy 2008. Under this policy the Ministry of Information in 2011 approved the installation, broadcast, and operation of the first 12 community radio stations in Bangladesh. By 2016, the number of active community radio stations rose to 14. To ensure free flow of information and people's right to information government enacted Right to Information Act 2009. Community Radio approval is a strong step to empower rural people in this regard.

Initially government approved 14 Initiators like Young Power in Action(YPSA) for Sitakunda, Chittagong, Nalta Community Hospital for Satkhira, LDRO for Bogra, BRAC for- Moulivi Bazer, Barandro Community Radio for -Naogaon, Proyas for -Chapai Nababgonj, CCD for - Rajshahi, Srizoni for - Jhinaidhah, EC Bangladesh for - Munsihigonj, MMC for - Barguna and RDRS for- Kurigram, Sundarban Community Radio for Koyra(Khulna), ACLAB for - Telnaf (Cox's Bazer) and Agriculture Information Services (AIS) for - Community Rural Radio for Amtoli (Barguna)

BNNRC provided technical assistance to around 200 organizations in the community radio application process through a National Help Desk on Community Radio in BNNRC Secretariat in Dhaka. Through this experience, a proactive institution should be activated to create the necessary human resource, research and development and technical cooperation for Community Radio in Bangladesh. In this backdrop, BNNRC has established Community Radio Academy (CRA). The academy will organize community radio related training, research, technical assistance and other support round the year to Community Radio Initiators.

Community radio is considered an alternative, effective mass media for the rural disadvantaged population to express their thoughts in their own voice using their own style. Usually Community radio is non-profit organization.

Internet media

There are an estimated 11.4 million internet users in Bangladesh, and use is unrestricted by the government; however some journalist's emails have been monitored.
People also use online newspapers and news portals. There are huge online newspaper and news portal in Bangladesh. However, not all news portals are listed by Bangladesh's government. Now Bangladesh government try to create memorandum for online news portal. Also some social media, such as Facebook, Twitter and OwnMirror become powerful media in Bangladesh.

See also

References

External links
  Bangladeshi All Newspapers and Media List
 Ministry of Information
 Bangladesh Telecommunication Regulatory Commission
 24 Live Newspaper
 Media and Telecommunications Lansdcape Guide in Bangladesh, a 'infoasaid' guide, May 2012, 135 pp.

 
Bangladesh
Bangladesh